Gregory Alan Dreiling (born November 7, 1962) is a former American professional basketball player. Dreiling played center. He attended high school at Kapaun Mt. Carmel Catholic High School in Wichita, Kansas. He initially attended Wichita State University and later transferred to the University of Kansas after his freshman year. He was selected by the Indiana Pacers in the second round of the 1986 NBA draft. Dreiling played ten seasons in the NBA, primarily as a backup center. He also played for the Dallas Mavericks and Cleveland Cavaliers in the NBA. He also played in the Continental Basketball Association for the Oklahoma City Cavalry and Rockford Lightning.

He serves as an advance scout for the Dallas Mavericks.

Career stats

NBA

Source

Regular season

|-
| style="text-align:left;"| 
| style="text-align:left;"| Indiana
| 24||0||5.3||.432||–||.833||1.8||.3||.1||.1||1.8
|-
| style="text-align:left;"| 
| style="text-align:left;"| Indiana
| 20||0||3.7||.471||–||.692||.9||.3||.1||.2||1.7
|-
| style="text-align:left;"| 
| style="text-align:left;"| Indiana
| 53||4||7.5||.558||–||.672||1.7||.3||.1||.2||2.4
|-
| style="text-align:left;"| 
| style="text-align:left;"| Indiana
| 49||0||6.3||.377||–||.735||1.8||.2||.1||.3||1.3
|-
| style="text-align:left;"| 
| style="text-align:left;"| Indiana
| 73||42||14.1||.505||.000||.600||3.5||.7||.3||.4||3.5
|-
| style="text-align:left;"| 
| style="text-align:left;"| Indiana
| 60||23||8.5||.494||1.000||.750||1.6||.4||.2||.3||2.0
|-
| style="text-align:left;"| 
| style="text-align:left;"| Indiana
| 43||0||5.6||.328||.000||.533||1.5||.2||.1||.2||1.1
|-
| style="text-align:left;"| 
| style="text-align:left;"| Dallas
| 54||19||12.7||.500||1.000||.711||3.1||.6||.3||.4||2.4
|-
| style="text-align:left;"| 
| style="text-align:left;"| Cleveland
| 58||3||8.3||.412||–||.634||2.0||.4||.1||.4||1.9
|-
| style="text-align:left;"| 
| style="text-align:left;"| Dallas
| 40||3||9.7||.459||1.000||.407||1.9||.3||.2||.2||2.0
|- class="sortbottom"
| style="text-align:center;" colspan="2"| Career
| 474 || 94 || 8.9 || .467 || .333 || .649 || 2.1 || .4 || .2 || .3 || 2.1

Playoffs

|-
| style="text-align:left;"| 1991
| style="text-align:left;"| Indiana
| 5 || 5 || 15.0 || .333 || – || .667 || 3.6 || .0 || .0 || .0 || 2.8
|-
| style="text-align:left;"| 1992
| style="text-align:left;"| Indiana
| 1 || 0 || 3.0 || – || – || – || .0 || .0 || .0 || .0 || .0
|-
| style="text-align:left;"| 1993
| style="text-align:left;"| Indiana
| 2 || 0 || 2.0 || 1.000 || 1.000 || – || .5 || .0 || .0 || .0 || 1.5
|-
| style="text-align:left;"| 1997
| style="text-align:left;"| Utah
| 1 || 0 || 7.0 || .000 || – || – || 1.0 || .0 || .0 || .0 || .0
|- class="sortbottom"
| style="text-align:center;" colspan="2"| Career
| 9 || 5 || 9.9 || .333 || 1.000 || .667 || 2.2 || .0 || .0 || .0 || 1.9

College

|-
| style="text-align:left;"|1981–82
| style="text-align:left;"|Wichita State
| 29 || 10 || 18.4 || .543 || || .753 || 4.2 || .6 || .3 || 1.2 || 8.1
|-
| style="text-align:left;"|1983–84
| style="text-align:left;"|Kansas
| 32 || 30 || 23.2 || .531 || || .742 || 4.8 || .9 || .4 || 1.2 || 9.7
|-
| style="text-align:left;"|1984–85
| style="text-align:left;"|Kansas
| 34 || 34 || 29.0 || .577 || || .727 || 6.9 || 1.2 || .4 || 1.6 || 13.1
|-
| style="text-align:left;"|1985–86
| style="text-align:left;"|Kansas
| 39 || 39 || 26.4 || .600 || || .711 || 6.7 || 1.5 || .3 || 1.2 || 11.6
|- class="sortbottom"
| style="text-align:center;" colspan="2"|Career
| 134 || 113 || 24.6 || .568 || || .731 || 5.8 || 1.1 || .4 || 1.3 || 10.8

References

External links
Career Stats

1962 births
Living people
American expatriate basketball people in France
American men's basketball players
Basketball players from Wichita, Kansas
Centers (basketball)
Cleveland Cavaliers players
Dallas Mavericks players
Indiana Pacers draft picks
Indiana Pacers players
Kansas Jayhawks men's basketball players
McDonald's High School All-Americans
Oklahoma City Cavalry players
Parade High School All-Americans (boys' basketball)
Rockford Lightning players
Wichita State Shockers men's basketball players
Universiade medalists in basketball
Universiade silver medalists for the United States